Louisiana's 5th State Senate district is one of 39 districts in the Louisiana State Senate. It had previously been represented by Democrat Karen Carter Peterson since a 2010 special election to replace resigning fellow Democrat Cheryl Gray Evans until her resignation in April 2022. It is currently the most Democratic-leaning district in the Senate.

Geography
District 5 is primarily located in New Orleans, including parts of Carrollton, the Garden District, Mid-City New Orleans, and Uptown New Orleans, stretching to also cover a small part of Jefferson Parish.

The district overlaps with Louisiana's 1st and 2nd congressional districts, and with the 82nd, 91st, 93rd, 97th, and 98th districts of the Louisiana House of Representatives.

At 15 square miles, it is the smallest Senate district in Louisiana.

Recent election results
Louisiana uses a jungle primary system. If no candidate receives 50% in the first round of voting, when all candidates appear on the same ballot regardless of party, the top-two finishers advance to a runoff election.

2019

2015

2011

Federal and statewide results in District 5

References

Louisiana State Senate districts
Orleans Parish, Louisiana
Jefferson Parish, Louisiana